The Korea Furniture Museum is a furniture museum located in Seongbuk-dong, Seongbuk-gu in Seoul, South Korea.

The Korea Furniture Museum, founded in 1993 by Chyung Mi-sook, is a private museum located in the Seongbuk neighborhood which is a “hilly area of luxurious homes”. The museum itself is a collection of several traditional aristocratic houses (hanok) “in a village setting designed to illustrate the way the Korean nobility lived during the Joseon dynasty”. Chyung Mi-sook had made the decision to present her personal collection of about 2,500 furniture pieces to the public  as she has been collecting traditional wooden furniture since the 1960s and was able to “effectively deliver to visitors the classical Korean lifestyle that cherishes harmony with nature and spiritual satisfaction”.

The exhibition hall is consistently being refreshed as it displays about 550 pieces of wooden furniture at a time out of the entire collection. “As well as discovering the localized characteristics of furniture from different parts of the country, visitors can gain an understanding of the general features of traditional Korean furnishings: their aesthetics emphasizing the intrinsic beauty of the raw materials over artificial decorations, thoughtful design taking into consideration the natural contraction and expansion of wood, the overall distribution of weight, and practical structure which makes full consideration of the human scale”. You will find that “many of the items of furniture for the wealthy class look very minimalist and modern”. 

“At the museum, visitors can also experience chagyeong, or “borrowed scenery,” one of the definitive characteristics of traditional Korean housing (hanok). Koreans of the past enjoyed the extensive landscapes visible through their windows as if they were private gardens. This traditional technique illustrates a receptive attitude toward nature and, at the same time, a macroscopic view of architecture. People of the time valued geomantic principles and accommodated natural geographic features into their architecture, but they also applied this creative technique of borrowed scenery as a means to not confine the human quarters to within the walls, but expand it as far as the eyes can reach in order to embrace nature”.

The Korea Furniture Museum has been visited by many well known figures such as the president of South Korea, spouses of G20 world leaders, Victoria Beckham, architects Frank Gehry and Zaha Hadid and more. “In July 2014, Xi Jinping and his wife, First Lady Peng Liyuan, visited for dinner, and were reported to have particularly enjoyed the doenjang jjigae — a soybean paste soup”. The museum has started to become widely recognized as an essential place to visit when in South Korea in order to gain a genuine understanding of a traditional Korean lifestyle.

See also
List of museums in South Korea

References

External links

Museums in Seoul
History of furniture
Decorative arts museums
Korean furniture